The Pfadfinderbund Weltenbummler e.V. (Scouts' Association Globetrotter) is an inter-confessional and apolitical German Scout association founded in 1981. It has about 2000 members and is part of the World Federation of Independent Scouts (WFIS), the Duke of Edinburgh's Award (DofE), the German Scout Association (DPV), the Bavarian Scout Council and the German Parity Welfare Association. It is recognized by German law as a charitable and nonprofit organization. The association is built on the principles constituted by Robert Baden-Powell. The scout uniform is dark blue; they wear black pants and striped neckerchiefs with varied woogles.

History 

The PbW was founded on December 12, 1981 in Coburg under the name Pfadfinderbund Bayern e.V. by groups leaving the Bund der Pfadfinderinnen und Pfadfinder due to ideological reasons. Later the association was named Pfadfinderbund Weltenbummler e.V. due to Scouts joining them from the German states of Saxony and Thuringia after the fall of the Berlin Wall in 1989–90. In 1993 groups were founded in Schleswig-Holstein, Hamburg and Berlin; the PbW also has groups in North Rhine-Westphalia, Baden-Württemberg and Lower Saxony. Currently there are groups in seven German states.

Structure 

The PbW contains five organizational subdivisions.

There are also different age groups:
  (Beaver) ages 3–7
  (Cubs) ages 7–11
  (Scouts) ages 11–16
  (Rover Scouts) ages 16–27
  (Team) ages 27+

Activities 

Reminiscent of the first patrol hike after World War II to the Lauterburg, a small castle in the top of a hill in near proximity to the Bavarian city of Coburg. The participating patrols hike about 25 kilometers with their bags and tents through the villages surrounding Coburg until they reach the ruins of the castle in Rödental.

Scout Law, Promise and Motto 
The Weltenbummlers' version of the Scout Law, Promise and Motto for the Girl and Boy Scout groups differs slightly from the original text of Baden Powell. There are different versions for the other age stages.

Scout law 
  – A Scout is chivalrous
  – A Scout is reliable
  – A Scout is true and faithful
  – A Scout is ready to help at every time
  – A Scout is brother to all Boy Scouts and Girls Scouts in the world and friend of each and every human
  – A Scout is always of good cheer
  – A Scout is simple and thrifty
  – A Scout is pure in thought, word and deed
  – A Scout protects plants and animals
  – A Scout obeys out of free will

Beaver version 
 – Participate, help and share

Cub version 
 – A cub helps wherever he can and is considerate of others

Rover Scouts version 
  – A Rover Scout puts himself out for the poor and weak in this world
  – A Rover Scout thrives for a natural life and actively supports the protection of the environment 
  – A Rover Scout contributes to the peaceful togetherness of Scouts and humans alike 
  – A Rover Scout grapples with questions of sense and value 
  – A Rover Scout actively pursues the tasks of life 
  – A Rover Scout takes responsibility in our democratic society 
  – A Rover Scout crucially carries along our association

Team version 
The team uses the same Scout Law as the Girl and Boy Scouts.

Scout promise 
 – I promise on my honor to serve God and my home country, to obey the Scout Law and do a daily good deed.

Beaver version 
. – I promise to be a good beaver and to obey the Laws.

Cub version 
. – I promise to be a good cub and to obey the Laws.

Rover Scouts version 
. – I promise on my honor to live my Scout ideals, to serve the society and our association and to give my best.

Team and Group Leader version 
. – I renew in trust in God my promise and vow on my honor as a Scout to never put our community at risk, to dutifully fulfill my tasks, to carry out my responsibilities to all my comrades, to protect nature and to secure our association's continued existence. I plead all Girl Scouts and Boy Scouts to assist me to the best of their ability in the fulfillment of my tasks.

Scout motto 
 – Always prepared!

Beaver version 
 – We share!

Cub version 
 – Our best!

Rover Scouts and Team version 
 – Always prepared!

References

http://wfis-Europe.org/wordpress/?page_id=33, 09.09.2013
http://dpvonline.de/verband/buende, 09.09.2013
http://pbw.org/bund/geschichte.php#2000, 09.09.2013
http://netzwerk.jugendprogramm.de/netzwerk/artikel/basis/deutschland/ergebnisse/5165, 09.09.2013
http://pbw.org/bund/, 09.09.2013
bundeslager.de, 09.09.2013
pbw-fuechse.de/Gruppen/Gruppen.html, 03.23.2014
 Bundesordnung des Pfadfinderbund Weltenbummler e.V. in the version from November 20, 2011

Scouting and Guiding in Germany